"Before I Die" is a song performed by American R&B singer Eamon, issued as the second single from his third studio album Golden Rail Motel. The song was written by Eamon along with producer Snipe Young and recording artist Rej Archie.

Release
"Before I Die" was officially released across all platforms on June 16, 2017. The New York City based magazine Mass Appeal previewed the single along with a positive review of the song on June 15, 2017.

Personnel

Eamon - all vocals
Jake Najor - drums
Dan Ubick - guitar and Hammond B-3 organ
Connie Price - percussion
David Ralicke - tenor and baritone saxophone
Jordan Katz - trumpet and flugelhorn
Snipe Young - bass guitar, Hammond organ, additional drums, additional outdo background vocals

Horn arrangements by Dan Ubick and Eamon
All music recorded at The Lion's Den in Topanga Canyon, California
All vocals recorded at The Space Ship in Los Angeles, California
Mixed by Steve Kaye at SunKing Studios
Mastered by Dave Cooley at Elysian Masters

References

External links
Lyrics

2017 songs
2017 singles
Eamon (singer) songs